Vanod is a town and former Rajput salute state in Gujarat, western India.

History 
Vanod was a Fifth Class princely state covering 57 square miles, comprising the town and twelve more villages,t had a population of 409 in 1901, yielding a state revenue of 6,435 rupees (1903-4, mostly from land) and a paying a tribute of 324 rupees, to the British and Junagadh State.

External links and sources 
 Imperial Gazetteer, on dsal.uchicago.edu

Princely states of Gujarat
Jat princely states